Franz Otto Knabe (June 12, 1884 – May 17, 1961), also known as "Dutch", was an American Major league second baseman from Carrick, Pennsylvania, who played for four teams.  Knabe received MVP votes in three-straight seasons, 1911-1913, as a member of the Philadelphia Phillies and during his time with the Phillies, he led the National League in sacrifice hits. He was the player-manager for the only two season the Baltimore Terrapins and the Federal League were in existence.

Knabe twice received a single vote for the Baseball Hall of Fame, once in 1939, and the other in 1942. He died in Philadelphia, Pennsylvania, and was interred at New Cathedral Cemetery.

See also
List of Major League Baseball player–managers

References

External links

1884 births
1961 deaths
Baseball players from Pittsburgh
Major League Baseball second basemen
Pittsburgh Pirates players
Philadelphia Phillies players
Baltimore Terrapins players
Chicago Cubs players
Minor league baseball managers
Colorado Springs Millionaires players
Pueblo Indians players
Richmond Virginians (minor league) players
Major League Baseball player-managers